Aino Karppinen (born 7 August 1997) is a Finnish ice hockey player and member of the Finnish national team, currently playing in the Swedish Women's Hockey League (SDHL) with AIK Hockey Dam.

Playing career
Karppinen developed in the youth department of Rovaniemen Kiekko (RoKi), an ice hockey club in her hometown of Rovaniemi. She debuted at the women's senior level with RoKi Naiset in the 2013–14 season of the Naisten Mestis, during which she played a total of six matches. Over the following seasons, she variously played with RoKi Naiset and the RoKi under-16 and under-18 men's teams. During the 2016–17 Naisten Mestis season, Karppinen served as RoKi Naiset's alternate captain.

In the 2018–19 season, she moved to Oulu to play with Kärpät Naiset of the Naisten Liiga. With Kärpät, she won Finnish Championship bronze in 2019 and the team qualified for the 2020 bronze medal game before the playoffs were cancelled due to the COVID-19 pandemic.

After RoKi Naiset gained promotion to the Naisten Liiga at the conclusion of the 2019–20 season, Karppinen returned to her home club for the 2020–21 Naisten Liiga season. In addition to playing with RoKi Naiset, she also played 21 games with the RoKi U18 men's team in the 2020–21 U18 Mestis season.

International play
Karppinen was a member of the Finnish national under-18 ice hockey team during the 2015–16 international season, which culminated with her participation in the 2016 IIHF World Women's U18 Championship. At the World U18 Championship, Karppinen was Finland’s highest scoring defenseman, recording three points (1+2) in five games.

At the senior level, Karppinen has appeared with the Finnish national team at various tournaments in the 2018–19 and 2019–20 international seasons, including three of the four tournaments comprising the 2019–20 Women's Euro Hockey Tour. She participated in the national team training camp in preparation for the 2020 IIHF World Women's Championship but was not selected to the final roster. The 2021 IIHF Women's World Championship was her World Championship debut. She was the first Rovaniemi-born product of the RoKi youth system to be selected to the Finnish women's national team.

Career statistics

Regular season and playoffs

International

References

External links 
 

1997 births
Living people
Finnish women's ice hockey defencemen
Luleå HF/MSSK players
Oulun Kärpät Naiset players
People from Rovaniemi
RoKi Naiset players
Sportspeople from Lapland (Finland)